Antoine-Noé Polier de Bottens (17 December 1713 – 9 August 1783) was an 18th-century Swiss Protestant theologian.

Biography 
Antoine-Noé Polier de Bottens descended from a noble family from the French Rouergue that they left for Switzerland in the 16th century to escape persecution as Huguenots and not have to abjure their Protestant faith. The first known member of this family was Jean Polier, who died in 1602 after being Secretary of the Embassy of France in Geneva, a family which included scholars, professors and officers who served with distinction in the armies of most major powers.

He was the son of Jean Jacques de Polier de Bottens (1670-1747), knight banneret of Lausanne and his wife Salomée Jeanne Elisabeth Quisard (ca. 1670–1735).

He first began to study theology in Lausanne then, in order to complete his studies, moved to Leiden University, where he obtained a doctorate in 1739. Back in his home country, de Polier took over a parish in the city of Lausanne. From 1743 he was third, 1754 second, and 1765 first pastor in Lausanne, Seigneur de Bottens, ministre du Saint-Évangile, 1er pasteur des Églises de Lausanne.
In 1759, he was head of the "Séminaire protestant français de Lausanne", and then in 1766 advanced as dean of the chapter.

Through an extensive correspondence with Voltaire during the period 1753–1759, he was encouraged by the famous thinker to have his writings published by Marc-Michel Bousquet's (1696–1762) publishing company.

In the realm of his competences, de Polier wrote at least nine but unauthorized articles for the Encyclopédie by Diderot and D'Alembert:  Kijovn, Liturgie, Logomachie, Magicien, Magie, Malachbelus, Mânes, Maosim and Messie. Voltaire adopted these articles for his Dictionnaire philosophique (1764), but modified extensively passages when they put in question beliefs on a literal interpretation of Scriptures.

On April 13, 1744, he married Elisabeth Antoinette Susanne de Lagier-Pluvianes (1722-1769). Both had five daughters and four sons.

Works (selection) 
 La Sainte Ecriture de l'Ancien Testament. 6 vol. (1764–1766)
 Dissertatio philologica qua disquiritur de puritate dialecti arabicae, comparate cum puritate dialecti hebraeae in relatione ad antediluvianam linguam, quam sub praesidio  D. Alberti Schultens. Lugduni in Batavis: apud J. Luzac, (1739)

References

Sources 
 Pierre Larousse, Grand Dictionnaire universel du XIXe, vol. 12, Paris, Administration du grand Dictionnaire universel, 1866.

Bibliography 
 F.-A. Forel (Hrsg.): Les souvenirs de jeunesse d'Antoine de Polier de Bottens. In RHV, (1911) pp. 117–128, 142–148, 171–181, 237–249
 Raymond Naves: Voltaire et l´Encyclopédie. Paris (1938) pp. 23–33; 43; 141–148; 185–194

External links 
 Polier de Bottens, Antoine Noé (1713 - 1783), Consortium of European Research Libraries
 Polier, Jean-Antoine-Noé (de Bottens)

18th-century Swiss people
Swiss Protestant ministers
18th-century Calvinist and Reformed theologians
Contributors to the Encyclopédie (1751–1772)
People from Lausanne
1713 births
1783 deaths